Sam Chupp is a tabletop game designer from the United States.

Career
Sam Chupp is the co-creator of the roleplaying games Wraith: the Oblivion (1994) and Changeling: The Dreaming (1995). Chupp was the Special Guest at the Marmalade Dog Gamefest II in 1995. He also wrote the religious biblical verse in the best-selling art book called the Book of Nod. He won an Origins Award in 2003 for Best Game Aid Or Accessory for his work on Gamemastering Secrets by Grey Ghost Press. He lives in Atlanta, Georgia.

Books
Sins of the Fathers HarperCollins

Literature References
''The Essential Guide to Werewolf Literature By Brian J. Frost
Published by University of Wisconsin Press, 2003
Original from the University of California
, 9780879728595

References

External links
 
 Sam Chupp (Official Site)

American podcasters
Living people
Role-playing game designers
White Wolf game designers
Year of birth missing (living people)